Barbara M. Terhal (born 1969) is a theoretical physicist working in quantum information and quantum computing. She is a researcher at the Forschungszentrum Jülich (Jülich Research Center), a professor in the EEMCS Department at TU Delft, as well as the Research Lead for the Terhal Group at QUTech. Her research concerns many areas in quantum information theory, including entanglement detection, quantum error correction, fault-tolerant quantum computing and quantum memories.

Education and early life 
Barbara Terhal was born in Leiden, 1969. Already in her early school days, she enjoyed mathematics, physics and solving puzzles.

Terhal completed her PhD Cum Laude on "Quantum Algorithms and Quantum Entanglement" at the University of Amsterdam in 1999, making her the first person to receive a PhD in quantum computing in the Netherlands. As part of her thesis, she coined the term entanglement witness and proposed their use as alternatives to Bell tests for entanglement detection.

Career and research 
After her PhD, Terhal joined the IBM Watson Research Centre in Yorktown Heights, New York and the California Institute of Technology (Caltech) as a postdoctoral researcher. Between 2001 and 2010, she worked at IBM on a number of topics, including low-depth quantum circuits or stoquastic Hamiltonians, perturbative gadgets for quantum simulation and quantum complexity theory. She also developed quantum protocols for remote state preparation, quantum locking and quantum data hiding.

In 2010, Terhal became a professor in theoretical physics at RWTH Aachen University. In addition, she holds another position at the Forschungszentrum Jülich since 2015.

Since 2007, Terhal has been a fellow of the American Physical Society and has held the post of Distinguished Visiting Research Chair at the Perimeter Institute in Waterloo, Canada since 2014. She is also a professor at QuTech in Delft since 2017.

Terhal's current research focuses on quantum error correction and its realisation in solid-state qubits.  She is also interested in quantum complexity theory and how it can be used to demonstrate the power of a quantum computer.

Awards 
Barbara Terhal has received the following awards:

 Awarded the Outstanding Innovation Award by IBM Research in 2007
 Elected a Distinguished Visiting Research Chair at Perimeter Institute, Waterloo, Canada in 2014
 Selected as Outstanding Referee by the American Physical Society in 2015
 Elected member of the Royal Netherlands Academy of Arts and Sciences in 2020.

Publications 
Her publications include:

 B.M. Terhal, “Bell Inequalities and The Separability Criterion”, Physics Letters A 271, 319 (2000)
 B.M. Terhal and D.P. DiVincenzo, “Adaptive quantum computation, constant depth quantum circuits, and Arthur Merlin games”, Quant. Inf. and Comp. 4:2, pp. 134–145 (2004)
 B.M. Terhal, “Quantum Error Correction for Quantum Memories”, Rev. Mod. Phys. 87, 307 (2015)

She has also written an essay on the fragility of quantum information.

References

External links
CV on RWTH Aachen University staff page

Living people
21st-century Dutch physicists
Dutch women physicists
Members of the Royal Netherlands Academy of Arts and Sciences
1969 births
People from Leiden
Fellows of the American Physical Society